Mashhadi Kola (also Romanized as Mashhadī Kolā) is a village in Feyziyeh Rural District, in the Central District of Babol County, Mazandaran Province, Iran. At the 2006 census, its population was 501, in 122 families.

References 

Populated places in Babol County